Pray 4 Love is the second studio album by American rapper and singer Rod Wave. It was released on April 3, 2020, through Alamo Records. The album contains one collaboration featuring American rapper ATR Son Son on the track "Rags2Riches". A deluxe edition was released on August 7, 2020, featuring Yo Gotti and Lil Baby, the latter on the remix of "Rags2Riches". Twelve of the album's tracks charted on the Billboard Hot 100, with "Rags2Riches" becoming Rod Wave's highest-charting song at the time, peaking at number 12. Music videos were released for all of the album's singles.

Background
The rapper revealed that the album was created in only one month. In an interview with Apple Music, the rapper explained the process of making music, saying that it "helps me talk about [my eating problems]. I don't regret going through none of it, because if it hadn't went down like that, 'Heart on Ice' wouldn't have even been a song. It would have been 'Wrist on Ice'". Generally, he wanted the album listeners to feel like him instead of "pinpoint just one" message.

Critical reception

Pray 4 Love was met with generally positive reviews. At Album of the Year, the album received an average score of 77 out of 100, based on two reviews. Tom Breihan of Stereogum described the project as "a warm and emotionally intense collection of stressed-out laments" with "thoughtful and graceful melodies", while lyrically, he "mostly sing-raps about overcoming huge struggles and then facing more". Tom Hull called it "a hip-hop lovers rock".

Commercial performance
Pray 4 Love debuted at number two on the US Billboard 200 with 72,000 album-equivalent units (including 2,000 pure album sales) in its first week. It was Rod Wave's highest position on the chart at the time, and is his second US top-10 album. In its second week, the album dropped to number nine on the chart, earning an additional 34,000 units that week. In its third week, the album remained at number nine on the chart, earning 32,000 more units. As of December 2020, the album has earned over 1,035,000 album-equivalent units in the US.

Track listing

Charts

Weekly charts

Year-end charts

Certifications

References

2020 albums
Rod Wave albums